Rendezvous With Destiny (Mawid Maa El Qadar) is an Algerian television series, produced and broadcast by Télévision Algérienne, directed by Djaafar Gacem, written by Karim Khadim and Djaafar Gacem. It debuted in October 2007 on Télévision Algérienne, A3 and Canal Algérie, and ended in November 2007.

Cast  
 Othmane Ben Daoud as Malek Bachiri
 Sid Ahmed Agoumi as L'Inspecteur Allal
 Malika Belbey as Hanane Belhachemi
 Sofia Kouninaf as Feriel Bachiri
 Azzedine Bouragheda as Merouane
 Karim Zenasni as Smaïl
 Boualem Bennani
 Larbi Zekkal as The father of Feriel
 Imane Nawel
 Aïda Kechoud
 Abdelkrim Briber
 Fatiha Soltan
 Faiza Ghazi
 Samira Sahraoui
 Ikram Mouak
 Nassim Zaidi
 Ahmed Manssef Abou Chenane
 Djamel Bounab
 Zahia Mekhlouf
 Mouna Adda
 Abdelaziz Guerda
 Zineb Arras
 Wahid Nader
 Mohamed Laawadi
 Rabeh Laacha
 Zaki
 Ania
 Hamid Mesbah
 Sid Ali Ben Tchikou
 Zohir Kacem
 El-Hadi Mellouli
 Hafida Ben Diaf
 Razika Farhane
 Hamid Amirouche
 Djamel Hammouda
 Hassan Ben Jedou
 Kheira Bakhti
 Biyouna
 Amel Wahbi
 Cherif Tiabi

Series overview

References 

2007 Algerian television series debuts
2007 Algerian television series endings
Arabic television series
2000s Algerian television series
Public Establishment of Television original programming